Bikramjit Basu is currently a full professor at Indian Institute of Science, Bangalore, specializing in Engineering Ceramics and Biomaterials Science.  He was awarded the Shanti Swarup Bhatnagar Prize for science and technology, the highest science award in India, for the year 2013 in engineering science category. The prize was awarded for his "outstanding contributions encompassing theory and experiments to significantly expand our  understanding of the in vitro cell functionality modulation on engineered  bio-materials using electric field simulation approach". With a team of clinicians and entrepreneurs, he is actively involved in translating his research into implantable biomedical devices for orthopedic and dental restorative applications and currently leading a center of Excellence at IISc, Bangalore. In 2015, he received the National Bioscience award.  Besides, Prof. Basu is also involved in development of Zirconum diboride based UHTCs.

Basu obtained his undergraduate and postgraduate degrees, both in Metallurgical Engineering from National Institute of Technology, Durgapur and Indian Institute of Science, Bangalore in 1995 and 1997, respectively. He secured PhD degree  in Ceramics from  Katholieke Universiteit Leuven, Belgium in 2001. After returning to India, he joined IIT Kanpur in 2001 as Assistant Professor and was promoted to full professor at IIT Kanpur in March, 2012. He joined Indian Institute of Science, Bangalore, in 2011.

Basu has authored/co-authored more than 200 peer-reviewed research papers with twenty three papers in Journal of American Ceramic Society. He has authored the first Indian textbook on Musculoskeletal Biomaterials (2016) published by Springer Nature Inc. and co-authored two textbooks, one on Structural Ceramics and the other on Tribology.

Basu has received young scientists awards from the Indian Ceramic Society (2003), the Indian National Academy of Engineering (2004), and the Indian National Science Academy (2005). He was given the Metallurgist of the Year  award (2010), instituted by Ministry of Steels, Government of India. He is the first Indian to receive (2008) the Coble Award  for Young Scholars from the American Ceramic Society. He is an elected Fellow of Indian National Academy of Engineering; National Academy of Sciences, India; West Bengal Academy of Science and Technology; and Society for Biomaterials, India. In 2017, he is elected as a fellow of American Institute of Medical and Biological Engineering.

References

External links
 https://web.archive.org/web/20160427051933/http://mrc.iisc.ernet.in/~bikram/index.html

Living people
Indian biochemists
Academic staff of the Indian Institute of Science
Recipients of the Shanti Swarup Bhatnagar Prize for Science and Technology
Scientists from Bangalore
N-BIOS Prize recipients
Fellows of the Indian National Academy of Engineering
Fellows of The National Academy of Sciences, India
Fellows of the American Institute for Medical and Biological Engineering
Year of birth missing (living people)
Recipients of the Shanti Swarup Bhatnagar Award in Engineering Science
Engineers from West Bengal